Dala is a densely populated Local Government Area in Kano State, Nigeria within Kano city created in May, 1989 from the old Kano Municipal Local Government. It is located in the north-west part of the Kano metropolis. Its headquarter is in Gwammaja.

History
It contains Dalla Hill from which it got its name and was once the capital of the Sultanate of Kano.

Geography
It has an area of 19 km and a population of 418,777 as at the 2006 census. It is thus the largest Local Government Area in Nigeria.

The postal code of the area is 700.

Economy
Among popular economic and commercial activities in Dala are dyeing, black smith, local bread making, pot making, farming, fishing, shoe making and other commercial undertakings.

Politics
The Local Government is dubbed in  meaning 'the Democratic Centre of Nigeria'.

Education
One of Nigeria's unity schools,  the Government Girls College is in Dala.

Personalities
It is the residential place of the prominent politician Mallam Aminu Kano who was born in Sudawa Gwale Local Government but had his personal residence at Gwammaja Dala Local Government, his personal residence was converted to the Centre for Democratic Research and Training by the Federal Government in order to immortalize his name and preserve his teachings and ideas for future generations.

Another prominent resident is business mogul and Nigerian billionaire, Alhaji Aminu Dantata whose descendants migrated from Bebeji to Sarari / Koki in Dala Local Government.

Notable Clans

References

Local Government Areas in Kano State
Kano